Marianne Gartner is an Austrian female curler.

At the national level, she is a two-time Austrian women's champion curler (1982, 1983).

Teams

Women's

References

External links

Living people
People from Kitzbühel
Austrian female curlers
Austrian curling champions
Sportspeople from Tyrol (state)
Year of birth missing (living people)
Place of birth missing (living people)